Mirwais Sadiq (1973 – March 21, 2004) was the Civil Aviation Minister of Afghanistan and the son of the Ismail Khan, who was then the governor of Herat Province.

He died during an exchange of fire in the city of Herat between supporters of Zahir Nayebzada, a commander for the central government, and Ismail Khan. Nayebzada claimed responsibility for the assassination, but insisted that Sadiq had only been killed in self-defense. President Hamid Karzai later said Sadiq's death was caused by a "small accident."

References

1973 births
2004 deaths
Assassinated Afghan politicians
Aviation ministers of Afghanistan